Roger Wright may refer to:

Roger Wright (music administrator) (born 1956), British music administrator
Roger Wright (pianist) (born 1974), American pianist

See also
Rogers H. Wright (1927–2013), American psychologist